Nora Gregor (3 February 1901 – 20 January 1949) was an Austrian stage and film actress.

Biography
She was born Eleonora Hermina Gregor in Görz, a town which then belonged to Austria-Hungary, but is now part of Italy, to Austrian-Jewish parents.

Her first husband was Mitja Nikisch, a pianist and son of celebrated orchestral conductor Arthur Nikisch. They divorced circa 1934.

In the mid-1930s, Gregor became the mistress of the married vice chancellor of Austria, the Austro-fascist, nationalist politician Prince Ernst Rüdiger von Starhemberg, with whom she had a son, Heinrich (1934–1997). On 2 December 1937, five days after the prince's marriage to his first wife (the former Countess Marie-Elisabeth von Salm-Reifferscheidt-Raitz) was annulled, he and Gregor wed in Vienna.

In 1938, the Starhembergs emigrated to France through Switzerland, and her husband joined the Free French forces; cut off from their money and 80 family estates, they were supported for a period by Starhemberg's close friend Friedrich Mandl, the Austrian armaments magnate. In 1942, the Starhembergs moved to Argentina where they lived under humble circumstances. She was depressed by her exile to South America, and many sources claim her early death in Viña del Mar, Chile was a suicide. However, her biographer Hans Kitzmüller calls a suicide unlikely and notes that her death was probably from natural causes.

Career
Gregor entered films in the early 1920s. She worked briefly in Hollywood during the early sound era, appearing in the foreign-language versions of films such as The Trial of Mary Dugan (1929) and His Glorious Night (1929). She was considered to be one of Austria's more popular film stars during this time, and she appeared as a stage actress at the famous Burgtheater.

During her French exile, Gregor played her most famous screen role as Christine de la Chesnaye in Jean Renoir's 1939 film La Règle du Jeu. Her last appearance was in the 1945 Chilean film La Fruta mordida.

See also
List of unsolved deaths

Filmography

Names and Styles
 1901 –ca. 1920: Fräulein Eleanora Gregor
 ca. 1925–ca.1934: Frau Mitja Nikisch (privately), Fräulein Nora Gregor (professionally)
 ca. 1934–1937: Fräulein Nora Gregor (professionally)
 1937–1949: Her Most Serene Highness Princess von Starhemberg (privately; see Austrian nobility and Adelsaufhebungsgesetz), Fräulein Nora Gregor (professionally)

References

External links

 
 Photographs and literature
 Tribute website

1901 births
1949 deaths
1949 suicides
20th-century Austrian actresses
Austrian emigrants to Chile
Austrian film actresses
Austrian silent film actresses
Austrian stage actresses
People from Gorizia
Starhemberg family
Unsolved deaths